Dabney State Recreation Area is a park on the Sandy River in the U.S. state of Oregon. Located in Multnomah County outside the city of Troutdale, the park offers swimming, boating, disc golf, and other activities.

See also 
 List of Oregon state parks

References

External links 
  from the State of Oregon

State parks of Oregon
Parks in Multnomah County, Oregon